Kingshill is a settlement on the island of Saint Croix in the United States Virgin Islands.  Kingshill is home to the University of the Virgin Islands campus in St. Croix. The St. Croix campus opened in 1964.

References

Populated places in Saint Croix, U.S. Virgin Islands